Antoni Subirà (19 February 1940 – 7 January 2018) was a Spanish politician who was a member of Parliament of Catalonia (1980–1993) and co-founder of Democratic Convergence of Catalonia.

References

1940s births
2018 deaths
Members of the Parliament of Catalonia
Catalan nationalists